Douglas Allen Brown (born June 12, 1964) is an American former professional ice hockey right winger. He played in the National Hockey League with the New Jersey Devils, Pittsburgh Penguins, and Detroit Red Wings between 1987 and 2001. With Detroit he won the Stanley Cup twice, in 1997 and 1998. Internationally he played for the American national team at four World Championships and the 1991 Canada Cup.

Playing career
After playing four seasons with Boston College, Brown was signed as an undrafted free agent by the New Jersey Devils on August 6, 1986. Before playing hockey at Boston College, Brown played on St. Mark's School's varsity hockey team and was a member of the class of 1982. St. Mark's is a private school located in Southborough, Massachusetts.

Brown made his professional debut with the American Hockey League's Maine Mariners in the 1986–87 season. He also appeared in four NHL games with the Devils that same season. After six seasons with the Devils, Brown joined the Pittsburgh Penguins for the 1993–94 season. He then joined the Detroit Red Wings in 1994–95. Brown is a two-time Stanley Cup winner, having won the Cup in consecutive years with the Red Wings in 1997 and 1998.

The Nashville Predators selected Brown in the 1998 NHL Expansion Draft, but traded him back to Detroit three weeks later for Petr Sykora, a draft pick, and future considerations. Brown played three more seasons with the Red Wings before retiring after the 2000–01 season.

Brown appeared in 854 games in his NHL career, scoring 160 goals and adding 216 assists. He also played in 109 Stanley Cup playoff games, scoring 23 goals and recording 23 assists. He was a member of the Detroit Red Wings for their Stanley Cup victories in the 1996–97 and 1997–98 seasons. Brown also represented the American national team in several international competitions.

Post-playing career
Since retiring from the National Hockey League in 2001, Brown has been involved in a variety of venture capital and private equity projects which include technology, oil & gas, real estate and manufactured housing markets, sporting goods, and sports teams.

Brown is the founder and managing partner of Trinity Global Partners, LLC. Trinity is a financial and technology management consulting firm. Its clients include Authentic4D and Titan Advisors, a $4.5 billion fund of hedge funds.

Personal life
Brown's brother Greg also played in the NHL with the Buffalo Sabres, Pittsburgh Penguins and Winnipeg Jets. He attended and played for Boston College, and is currently an assistant coach of the New York Rangers.

Brown's son Patrick is a player for the Philadelphia Flyers, having played four seasons at Boston College from 2010 to 2014. Patrick was coached by his uncle Greg for all four years, including his senior season when he was captain. Doug's son Christopher played for Boston College, and was drafted in 2014 by the Buffalo Sabres.

Wellington Mara, NFL Hall of Famer and former owner of the New York Giants, was Brown's father-in-law. Through marriage, Brown is the uncle of actresses Rooney and Kate Mara.

Career statistics

Regular season and playoffs

International

Transactions
August 6, 1986 signed as a free agent by the New Jersey Devils.
September 28, 1993 signed as a free agent by the Pittsburgh Penguins.
January 18, 1995 claimed in the waiver draft by the Detroit Red Wings.
January 7, 1998 signed a 3-year contract extension with the Detroit Red Wings.
June 26, 1998 claimed by the Nashville Predators in the expansion draft.
July 14, 1998 traded by the Nashville Predators to the Detroit Red Wings in exchange for Petr Sýkora, 1999 third round pick (#91-Mike Comrie), 1999 conditional fourth round pick (#124-Alexander Krevsun) or future considerations.

Awards and honors

Brown currently sits on the board of directors at the Michigan Sports Hall of Fame, and is an inductee of the Boston College and St. Mark's Hall of Fame.

References

External links
 

1964 births
Living people
AHCA Division I men's ice hockey All-Americans
American men's ice hockey right wingers
Boston College Eagles men's ice hockey players
Detroit Red Wings players
Fay School alumni
Ice hockey players from Massachusetts
Maine Mariners players
New Jersey Devils players
People from Southborough, Massachusetts
Pittsburgh Penguins players
Sportspeople from Worcester County, Massachusetts
St. Mark's School (Massachusetts) alumni
Stanley Cup champions
Undrafted National Hockey League players
Utica Devils players